Mediodactylus russowii, also known commonly as the grey thin-toed gecko, Russow's bent-toed gecko, and the Transcaspian bent-toed gecko, is a species of lizard in the family Gekkonidae. The species is native to Asia. There are two recognized subspecies.

Etymology
The specific name, russowii, is in honor of Estonian naturalist Valerian von Russow (1842–1879).

Geographic range
M. russowii is found from Russia to Turkmenistan, Kazakhstan, northeastern Iran, northwestern China, Uzbekistan, Tajikistan, and Kyrgyzstan.

Habitat

Reproduction
M. russowii is oviparous.

Subspecies
The following two subspecies are recognized as being valid, including the nominotypical subspecies.
Mediodactylus russowii russowii 
Mediodactylus russowii zarudnyi 

Nota bene: A trinomial authority in parentheses indicates that the subspecies was originally described in a genus other than Mediodactylus.

Gallery

References

Further reading
Nikolsky AM (1900). "Reptiles, amphibies [sic] et poissons, recueillis pendant le voyage de Mr. N. A. Zaroudny en 1898 dans la Perse ". Annuaire du Musée Zoologique de l'Académie Impériale des Sciences de St.-Pétersbourg 24 (4): 376-417 + Plate XX. (Gymnodactylus zarudnyi, new species, p. 385-387 + Plate XX, middle figure). (Text in Russian, diagnoses and localities in Latin, title in French and Russian).
Sindaco R , Jeremčenko VK (2008). The Reptiles of the Western Palearctic. 1. Annotated Checklist and Distributional Atlas of the Turtles, Crocodiles, Amphisbaenians and Lizards of Europe, North Africa, Middle East and Central Asia. (Monographs of the Societas Herpetologica Italica). Latina, Italy: Edizioni Belvedere. 580 pp. . (Cyrtopodion russowii).
Strauch A (1887). "Bemerkungen über die Geckoniden-Sammlung im zoologischen Museum der Kaiserlichen Akademie der Wissenschaften zu St. Petersburg ". Mémoires de l'Académie impériale des Sciences de St.-Pétersbourg, Septième Série 35 (2): 1-72 + i-ii (index) + one plate. (Gymnodactylus russowii, new species, pp. 49–51 + plate figures 10-12). (in German).

Mediodactylus
Reptiles described in 1887